Robert Monahan (November 12, 1928 – January 31, 2020) was an American ice hockey defenceman who played for Michigan Tech in the 1950s.

Career
Monahan began attending Michigan College of Mining and Technology in 1947. When he joined the varsity team in 1948 the team was still trying to make a name for itself and he helped the Huskies post their first winning season in a decade in his second campaign. That year saw Monahan score the first hat-trick by a defenseman in program history, a feat that has been accomplished only three times since (as of 2020). After sitting out for two seasons, Monahan returned and continued to perform well for the Huskies, being named as an AHCA First Team All-American in his final season.

After graduating Monahan worked as a sales manager for the Ethyl Corporation and later formed his own consulting company. He was inducted into the Michigan Tech Athletic Hall of Fame in 1993.

Personal
Bob and his wife of 66 years, Jean, raised four children, 3 boys and a girl. Bob died in 2020 after a brief illness.

Statistics

Regular season and playoffs

Awards and honors

References

External links

1928 births
2020 deaths
American men's ice hockey defensemen
Ice hockey players from Rhode Island
People from Providence, Rhode Island
Michigan Tech Huskies men's ice hockey players
AHCA Division I men's ice hockey All-Americans